The following are the football (soccer) events of the year 1919 throughout the world.

Events
Due to the First World War several European leagues remain suspended.

Football League First Division expanded from 20 to 22 teams - Chelsea are saved from relegation while Arsenal are promoted despite finishing only fifth in the Second Division.
15 January: Espérance Sportive de Tunis is founded in the capital Tunis, Tunisia. It's the first club formed in Tunisia.
October: Leeds City expelled from the English Football League.
17 October: Leeds United are founded.

Winners club national championship
Argentina: Boca Juniors, Racing Club
Austria: Rapid Vienna
Belgium: no national championship
Denmark: Akademisk Boldklub
England: no national championship
France: no national championship
Germany: no national championship
Hungary: MTK Hungária FC
Iceland: KR
Italy: no national championship
Luxembourg: Sporting Club Luxembourg
Netherlands: Ajax Amsterdam
Paraguay: Cerro Porteño
Scotland: 
Division One: Celtic F.C.
Scottish Cup: No competition
Sweden: GAIS
Uruguay: Nacional
Greece: 1913 to 1921 - no championship titles due to the First World War and the Greco-Turkish War of 1919-1922.

International tournaments
1919 Far Eastern Championship Games in China (May 12–15, 1919)
 China

 South American Championship 1919 in Brazil (May 11, 1919 – May 29, 1919)

Births
 January 1 – Zyber Lisi, Albanian footballer
 January 18 – Toni Turek, German footballer (died 1984)
 January 23 – Bob Paisley, English footballer and manager (died 1996)
 February 12 – Ferruccio Valcareggi, Italian footballer and manager (died 2005)
 July 10 – Chale Silva, Colombian professional footballer (d. 2009)
 July 13 – Jack Wheeler, American professional footballer (died 2009)
 July 19 – Nordine Ben Ali, Algerian-French former association football player and manager (died 1996)
 December 5 – Hennes Weisweiler, German footballer and manager (died 1983)
 December 25 – Fikret Kırcan, Turkish footballer (died 2014)

Deaths

Clubs founded 
 Leeds United F.C.
 U.S. Salernitana 1919
 Piacenza Calcio 1919
 Valencia CF
 Real Murcia

References 

 
Association football by year